Hakea lehmanniana, commonly known as the blue hakea, is a shrub in the family  Proteacea. It has needle-shaped prickly leaves and blue flowers during winter months. It is endemic to an area  in the southern Wheatbelt and Great Southern regions of Western Australia.

Description
It blooms from June to August and produces attractive purple-blue fading to blue or white flowers in dense clusters in upper leaf axils.

Distribution and habitat
Blue hakea grows from Pingelly ranging south to Albany and east to Ravensthorpe. Grows in heath or shrubland on gravelly-loam, sand or sand over laterite in sun or semi-shade.  An adaptable species frost and drought tolerant and may be used as a ground cover and wildlife habitat.

Taxonomy and naming
Hakea lehmanniana  was first formally described in 1845 by Swiss botanist Carl Meisner and the description was published in Plantae Preissianae.  The species was named in honour of the German botanist, Johann Georg Christian Lehmann.

Conservation status
Hakea lehmanniana is classified as "not threatened" by the Western Australian Government.

References

lehmanniana
Eudicots of Western Australia
Plants described in 1845